Sergey Rusinov (born 14 January 1971) is a Russian biathlete. He competed in the men's sprint event at the 2002 Winter Olympics.

References

1971 births
Living people
Russian male biathletes
Olympic biathletes of Russia
Biathletes at the 2002 Winter Olympics
Sportspeople from Novosibirsk